Soutomaior Castle is a medieval castle located in the municipality of the same name in Galicia, Spain. It is situated about 119 metres above sea level on the top of Mount Viso.

Built in the 12th century by Pedro Álvarez de Soutomaior it is one of the most important castles in Southern Galicia.

See also 

 Sobroso Castle
 Fort Monterreal

References

Castles in Galicia (Spain)
Bien de Interés Cultural landmarks in the Province of Pontevedra